Carl Otto Lenz (born 5 June 1930 in Berlin) is a German lawyer, member of the German Bundestag (1965–1984) for the CDU and Advocate General at the European Court of Justice (1984–1997).

Biography 
Carl Otto Lenz is the son of the lawyer Otto Lenz (Secretary of the Federal Chancellery 1951–1953, member of the German Bundestag 1953-1957) and Marie Liese Pohl. In 1948, he graduated from high school in Munich. From 1949 to 1953, he studied law and political science at the Ludwig-Maximilians University in Munich, the Albert-Ludwigs University of Freiburg, the University of Geneva (Switzerland) and the University of Bonn. In Freiburg, he was a member of the Catholic Student Fraternity KDSt.V. Arminia Freiburg im Breisgau im CV. Lenz later studied at Cornell University in Ithaca, New York, the College of Administrative Sciences Speyer and Harvard University in Cambridge (Massachusetts). From 1961, he taught at the University of Bonn.

In 1959 he became Secretary of the Christian Democratic Group of the European Parliament in Luxembourg; From 1965 to 1984 he was a member of the German Bundestag, representing Bergstraße. For many years he was a member of the Legal Affairs Committee, and he was its chairman from 1969 to 1980.

Lenz is especially committed to Franco-German friendship; he was a member of the Franco-German Parliamentary Group and its chairman from 1969 to 1983.

From 1984 to 1997, Lenz was Advocate General at the European Court of Justice. During this time, he drafted about 400 submissions to the Court of Justice. Lenz is also editor of a handbook and the author of numerous works concerning EC law.

Since 1998 he has been a lawyer in Frankfurt and Brussels.

Awards and honors

 1976: Great Cross of Merit of the Federal Republic of Germany
 1980: Officer of the Legion of Honor
 1983: Grand Officer of the National Order of Merit of the French Republic
 1987: Bearer of the Hans-Dahs Medal of the German Bar Association
 1990: Honorary Professor of the Department of European Law at the University of the Saarland
 1998: Bearer of the Grand Cross of the Order of Merit of the Grand Duchy of Luxembourg

See also

List of members of the European Court of Justice

References 
 
 

1930 births
Living people
Jurists from Berlin
Ludwig Maximilian University of Munich alumni
Cornell University alumni
Harvard University alumni
Advocates General of the European Court of Justice
Academic staff of the University of Bonn
Commanders Crosses of the Order of Merit of the Federal Republic of Germany
Grand Officers of the Ordre national du Mérite
Officiers of the Légion d'honneur
Grand Crosses of the Order of Merit of the Grand Duchy of Luxembourg
German officials of the European Union